Lord Kaos was an Australian black metal band that formed in Sydney in 1994. For several years the group was the most prominent act of its style in the country with one founding member going on to record and perform with several Norwegian black metal bands including Dimmu Borgir. While Lord Kaos only released one album, the group was a considerable influence on the local heavy metal music scene as not only arguably the first but one of the few bands to record and perform Norwegian-style symphonic black metal.

History
Originally a five piece band formed by guitarist Jamie "Astennu" Stinson and vocalist Jamie "The Lord of Night Summoning" Marsh, they soon dropped the original drummer in favour of a drum machine and recorded the initial demo, Path to My Funeral Light in 1995. Later the same year, with the membership now down to four; Astennu, Marsh, bassist Incubus and keyboards by Sir Morrison, Lord Kaos recorded the album Thorns of Impurity with Astennu tracking guitars. The album was recorded for release on Sydney label Warhead Records but also found interest from Norway's Head Not Found. This caused a split in the group when Astennu relocated to Norway to pursue release for Lord Kaos there, only for the remaining band members to resist the move. The release of Thorns of Impurity was delayed due to this course of action and it was not issued (by Warhead) until late 1996. By then, Astennu had virtually completed his first Carpe Tenebrum album Majestic Nothingness with vocal contributions from Nagash of Dimmu Borgir, the guitarist for the band he would then join in 1997.

With the departure of Astennu, Lord Kaos came to a standstill. However, by early 1997 the group had reconvened with drummer Nigel Chad, guitarist Frank Munoz of the Sydney brutal death metal band Neuropath, and two members of the Newcastle black metal act Empery of Thorns, guitarist Darael and keyboards-player Shaun all being recruited. Incubus then left shortly afterwards, to be replaced by another ex-Neuropath member, Ali Chamas. This line-up remained together for almost two years. At the end of 1997 the band played on the Sydney leg of an Australian tour by Cradle of Filth and work began on a second album. Several tracks were eventually recorded and one, "Black Earth", later appeared on the 1999 compilation album Under the Southern Cross, from Sydney label Chatterbox Records. In the meantime, Marsh was also singing with a doom metal band called Elysium, with whom he recorded the album Dreamscapes in 1998; however this recording remained unreleased until 2001 when it surfaced on the short-lived Melbourne label Crestfallen Records.

Lord Kaos featured at the annual Metal for the Brain festival in Canberra in 1998 but in mid-1999 Munoz and Chamas both left the band. Incubus rejoined for a short time but after Metal for the Brain that year Lord Kaos went into hiatus again. Earlier in 1999 Marsh had joined another black metal act called Crucible of Agony who had played a support show with Impaled Nazarene and recorded several tracks, one of which, "Come Forth to the Lands of the Plague Bearer", would also appear on Under the Southern Cross. This band did little else however and after a complete line-up change evolved later into The Amenta.

By 2000 Lord Kaos was active as a live band once more. Along with Marsh, Darael and Shaun, the group now consisted of Beau Dyer from Elysium on bass and two members of Canberra band Psychrist, Yuri Ward and Glen Blazejak, on guitar and drums respectively. This version of the band featured at Metal for the Brain before playing some shows in early 2001, however several other performances were cancelled and in December Lord Kaos announced it had disbanded

Marsh has always remained open to the possibility of Lord Kaos reforming in the future, however this is probably unlikely. His other band Elysium, which also features Dyer, changed its name to Stone Wings in 2003 and released the self-funded album Bird of Stone Wings in 2004. Ward and Blazejak continued to play together in Psychrist until the drummer left in 2003 and the band folded. Ward is now a member of a band called Kill for Satan who have released one album. Astennu was fired from Dimmu Borgir in 1999 and since returning to Australia has recorded a third Carpe Tenebrum album and played in bands including Infernal Method and Stronger Than Hate but since 2003 has concentrated on sound engineering.

Discography

References

External links
Transcript of Jamie Marsh interview on ABC radio
Lord Kaos at the Australian Metal Guide
 Kill For Satan (featuring Yuri Ward) @ Myspace
 Masonic Temple myspace

Musical groups established in 1994
New South Wales musical groups
Australian heavy metal musical groups
Australian black metal musical groups
Musical groups disestablished in 2001
1994 establishments in Australia